Ninja Golf is an Atari 7800 video game developed by Blue Sky Software which combines scrolling beat 'em up and golf gameplay. Released in 1990, it was one of the final eleven games Atari Corporation released in 1990-91 for the 7800 before dropping support for the system.

In 2022, it was included in the video game compilation Atari 50.

Gameplay
The player starts each hole by aiming their ball and shooting it toward the green, then runs toward the ball, in traditional side-scrolling video game fashion, fighting various enemies encountered along the way.  These enemies include other ninjas, gophers, birds, giant mutant frogs, sharks and more, depending on the environment the ninja golfer is currently in. Sharks are encountered in water hazards and snakes in the sand traps.  Ninjas are encountered in all the environments, including underwater.

Reception
AllGame gave the game a two and a half star rating out of five. The review noted the repetitive gameplay and lack of replay value. In an AtariHQ review, Matthew Lippart praised the fighting, disliked the golf elements, and concluded with "a good game that's worth having just because it's friggin' weird." Atari 7800 Forever gave it a 4 out of 5, praising the whimsical gameplay and the overall fun factor of the game. 

In 2011, IGN called the game's box cover one of the most notable in video game history.

See also
Aqua Teen Hunger Force Zombie Ninja Pro-Am

References

1990 video games
Atari 7800 games
Atari 7800-only games
Atari games
Beat 'em ups
Golf video games
Japan in non-Japanese culture
Video games about ninja
Video games developed in the United States